Law Books in Print is a descriptive legal bibliography. It was published by Glanville Press. Marke, Sloan and Ryan said it is "an excellent source". S. Houston Lay said that a copy should be in the  possession of all substantial law libraries. Law Books in Print is the primary series for the determination of prices and current editions. It is updated by Law Books Published.

References
J Myron Jacobstein and Meira G Primsleur. Law Books in Print. Volume 3. Glanville Publishers. 1957. Snippet view from Google Books.
J Myron Jacobstein and Meira G Primsleur. Law Books in Print. Consolidated Edition. Volume I. Glanville Publishers, Inc. Dobbs Ferry, New York. 1965. Snippet view from Google Books.
J Myron Jacobstein and Meira G Primsleur. Law Books in Print. Consolidated Edition. Supplement, 1967. Glanville Publishers, Inc. Dobbs Ferry, New York. 1968. Snippet view from Google Books.
Nicholas Triffin and Alice Pidgeon. Law Books in Print. Seventh Edition. Glanville Publishers, Inc. 1994. . Volume 1. Snippet view from Google Books.
Bernita J. Davies. Columbia Law Review. Vol 58, No 4 (Apr 1958), pp 587–588. .
Jane Welch. International and Comparative Law Quarterly. Vol 21, No 1 (Jan 1972), pp 199–200. JSTOR.
Glanville Williams. Learning the Law. Tenth Edition. Stevens. 1978. Page 154.

Citations

Legal bibliographies
1957 non-fiction books
American non-fiction books